Kedah FA has won the Malaysian league championship three times (1993, 2007 & 2008), the Malaysia Cup four times (1990, 1993, 2007 & 2008).

The Malaysian FA Cup is an annual national knock-out football tournament. Kedah won the Malaysian FA Cup three times (1996, 2007 & 2008). This makes Kedah is the first and only football team in Malaysian history to do the treble twice in a row.

Honours

Doubles and Trebles

Seasonal achievement

World Clubs Ranking

1 October 2006 - 29 September 2008

Note: Ranking by IFFHS

See also
List of Kedah FA players

Kedah